Claudio Domingo Elórtegui Gómez (born 18 October 1976) is a Chilean journalist.

His speciality is political communication and mass media.

Biography
He is son of the Chilean economist Claudio Elórtegui Raffo, current Pontificia Universidad Católica de Valparaíso rector (2010–present), institution which Elórtegui Gómez studied journalism in its Institute (where today he is a professor and scholar). Previous to reach his charge as professor at PUCV, he realized both a MA and a PhD in Communication Sciences at Spain's Autonomous University of Barcelona.

He has been the host of news program UCV Televisión Noticias' central edition as well as he worked for Chamber of Deputies of Chile Channel in programs like Puntos de Vista (Points of view). On January 11, 2010, he represented UCV Televisión in the ANATEL 2009–10 presidential election debate appearing in the ballotage between centre-right candidate Sebastián Piñera (from National Renewal party) and centre-leftist Eduardo Frei Ruiz-Tagle, member of the Christian Democratic Party and son of former Chilean President, Eduardo Frei Montalva (1964–1970).

Works
 Populismo y Comunicación. Barcelona, UOCPress, 2013

References

External links
 PUCV Rectory Profile

1976 births
Chilean people
Chilean people of Basque descent
Chilean journalists
Pontifical Catholic University of Valparaíso alumni
Academic staff of the Pontifical Catholic University of Valparaíso
People from Valparaíso
Living people